Laurene is a given name. Notable people with the name include:

 Laurene Powell Jobs (born 1963), American heiress, businesswoman, and executive
 Laurene Landon (born 1957), Canadian-American film and television actress

See also
 Laureen
 Lauren (disambiguation)
 Loreen (disambiguation)